Jaiyden Hunt (born 20 July 1998) is an Australian rugby league footballer who plays as a  for the St. George Illawarra Dragons in the NRL.

Background
Hunt was born in Brisbane, Queensland, Australia.

He played his junior rugby league with St Brendans Brothers and the Easts Tigers before being signed by the Melbourne Storm.

Hunt attended St Thomas More College, Sunnybank for his secondary education.

Playing career
In 2014, Hunt played for the Easts Tigers in the Cyril Connell Cup before moving up to their Mal Meninga Cup team in 2015.

In 2016 and 2017, Hunt played for the Melbourne Storm in the Holden Cup. In 2018, he re-joined the Easts Tigers, playing in the Queensland Cup and Hastings Deering Colts.

2021
In 2021, Hunt joined the St George Illawarra Dragons on a train and trial contract and began playing for their NSW Cup team.

In Round 11 of the 2021 NRL season, Hunt made his NRL debut for St. George Illawarra against fierce rivals Cronulla-Sutherland at Kogarah Oval.

Statistics

References

External Links

St. George Illawarra Dragons profile

1998 births
Living people
Australian rugby league players
St. George Illawarra Dragons players
Rugby league props
Rugby league players from Brisbane
Eastern Suburbs Tigers players